Beep Beep is a rock band from Omaha, Nebraska, on Saddle Creek Records. The band was formed in July 2001 by Eric Bemberger and Chris Hughes, formerly of Saddle Creek group Gabardine. Former member Joel Petersen plays bass in The Faint and also has his own electronica project, Broken Spindles.  Their first album, Business Casual, was released August, 2004. A second album Enchanted Islands was released in March, 2009.

Band members
Current members:
Eric Bemberger
James Reilly
Ian Francis
Kyle Petersen

Former members:
Javid Dabestani
Chris Hughes (aka Chris Terry)
Ben Armstrong
AJ Mogis
Joel Petersen
Mike Sweeney
Katie Muth
Darren Keen

Discography
Business Casual (2004 · Saddle Creek Records)
Enchanted Islands (2009 · Saddle Creek Records)

References

External links
The Band's Myspace
Saddle Creek Records
Lazy-i Interview: July 2003
Lazy-i Interview: August 2004

Indie rock musical groups from Nebraska
Musical groups from Omaha, Nebraska
Musical groups established in 2001
2001 establishments in Nebraska
Saddle Creek Records artists